Juan Ojeda may refer to:
 Juan Ojeda (Argentine footballer) (born 1982)
 Juan Ojeda (Paraguayan footballer) (born 1998)

See also
 Juan Manuel Rodríguez Ojeda, Spanish embroiderer and designer
 Juan Battista de Ojeda, Roman Catholic prelate 
 Ojeda (surname)